Kamperveen is a village in the Dutch province of Overijssel. It is located in the municipality of Kampen, about 5 km south of the city.

Kamperveen was a separate municipality until 1937, when it became a part of IJsselmuiden.

History 
It was first mentioned in 1236 as "in Veno prope Campen", meaning "the bog of Kampen", and was originally a peat colony.

Kamperveen is a confusing village, because it is a merger of the hamlets De Heuvels, De Roskam, De Zande, Hogeweg, Posthoorn and Zuideinde, therefore, it does not have a clear centre. There are directional signs to Kamperveen, however each hamlet is marked with its own name.

Notable people 
 Jan Terlouw (born 1931), politician and author

References

Populated places in Overijssel
Former municipalities of Overijssel
Kampen, Overijssel